The discography of American artist Vory consists of one studio albums, three mixtapes, one extended play, and ten singles (including forty-six as a featured artist).

Studio albums

Mixtapes

Extended plays

Singles

Other charted songs

Guest appearances

Songwriting and guest vocals credits

Notes

References

Discographies of American artists
Hip hop discographies